David Guerault is a French retired professional boxer.  

He lost to Johnny Bredahl for the World Boxing Association bantamweight world title.

Guerault was a former European Boxing Union flyweight and bantamweight champion.

References

External links

1972 births
Living people
Flyweight boxers
Bantamweight boxers
French male boxers